KKS Siarka Tarnobrzeg was a Polish professional basketball team, founded in 1962 and based in Tarnobrzeg, Poland. The team played in the Polish Basketball League (PLK) in 2010s.  KKS Siarka Tarnobrzeg club withdrew the team from the third-tier II liga games for the 2018–19 season on 4 January 2019.

Season by season

Notable players

 Przemek Karnowski  
 Reggie Hamilton

References 

Basketball teams established in 2002
2019 disestablishments in Poland
Basketball teams in Poland
Tarnobrzeg
Sport in Podkarpackie Voivodeship